The 2017–18 Tennessee Volunteers basketball team represented the University of Tennessee in the 2017–18 NCAA Division I men's basketball season. The Volunteers were led by third-year head coach Rick Barnes. The team played its home games at Thompson–Boling Arena in Knoxville, Tennessee, as a member of the Southeastern Conference. They finished the season 26–9, 13–5 in SEC play to earn a share of the SEC regular season championship. As the No. 2 seed in the SEC tournament, they defeated Mississippi State and Arkansas before losing to Kentucky in the championship game. They received an at-large bid to the NCAA tournament as the No. 3 seed in the South region. There the Volunteers defeated Wright State before being upset by Loyola–Chicago in the Second Round.

Previous season
The Vols finished the 2016–17 season 16–16, 8–10 in SEC play to finish in a tie for ninth place. They lost in the second round of the SEC tournament to Georgia.

Offseason

Departures

Incoming transfers

2017 recruiting class

Source:

Roster

Depth chart

Source:

Schedule and results
 
|-
!colspan=12 style=| Exhibition

|-
!colspan=12 style=| Regular season

|-
!colspan=12 style=| SEC Tournament

|-
!colspan=12 style=| NCAA tournament

Rankings

^Coaches' Poll did not release a second poll at the same time as the AP.
*AP does not release post-NCAA Tournament rankings

See also
 2017–18 Tennessee Lady Volunteers basketball team

References

Tennessee
Tennessee Volunteers basketball seasons
Tennessee
Volunteers
Volunteers